The Cargo Muchacho Mountains are located in the southeast Colorado Desert in the Lower Colorado River Valley, in Imperial County, California in the United States. Much of the range's geology was described by the geologist John T. Dillon.

Geography
The range lies in a northwest-southeasterly direction, southeast of the Imperial Valley and northwest of the Colorado River and Yuma, AZ–Winterhaven, CA. The range lies south and southeast of the Chocolate Mountains and east of the Algodones Dunes.  Pilot Knob is a volcanic plug formed landmark peak to the south of the range.

The mountains are home to the American Girl Mine, and the Golden Bee and Cargo mines. The All American Canal passes to the south of the range.

References

Mountain ranges of the Colorado Desert
Mountain ranges of the Lower Colorado River Valley
Mountain ranges of Imperial County, California